Gerard McBurney (born 20 June 1954) is a British composer, arranger, broadcaster, teacher and writer.

Life 
Born in Cambridge, England, he is the son of Charles McBurney, an American archaeologist, and Anne Francis Edmondstone (née Charles), who was a British secretary of English, Scots, and Irish ancestry. Gerard's younger brother is Simon McBurney, an English actor, writer and director.

Gerard was educated at Winchester College, Corpus Christi College, Cambridge – where he read English Literature – and at the Moscow Conservatory.

Work 
For many years he lived in London, teaching first at the London College of Music and later, for 12 years, at the Royal Academy of Music. He also worked as artistic advisor with various orchestras, performers and presenters including The Hallé, Complicite and Lincoln Center.

In September 2006, he was appointed Artistic Programming Advisor to the Chicago Symphony Orchestra and Creative Director of the CSO's multimedia series Beyond the Score:

 Bartók – The Miraculous Mandarin  2006
 Mozart – Piano Concerto No. 27, K.595  2007
 Tchaikovsky – Symphony No. 4  2008
 Shostakovich – Symphony No. 4  2008
 Holst – The Planets: suite  2008
 Vivaldi – The 4 Seasons  2008
 Mussorgsky/Ravel – Pictures from an Exhibition  2008
 Sibelius – Symphony No. 5  2010
 Dvořák – Symphony No. 9 (From the New World)  2010
 Debussy – La Mer  2010

His original compositions include orchestral works, a ballet, a chamber opera, songs and chamber music as well as many theater scores. He also is well known for his reconstructions of various lost and forgotten works by Dmitri Shostakovich.In 2008 McBurney collaborated with Scottish poet Iain Finlay Macleod, director Kath Burlinson and choreographer Struan Leslie on an adaptation of The Silver Bough by F. Marian McNeill. The resultant work was produced by British Youth Music Theatre at the Aberdeen International Youth Festival.

As a scholar, he has published mostly in the field of Russian and Soviet music. For 20 years, he created and presented many hundreds of programmes on BBC Radio 3 (the classical music station of the British Broadcasting Corporation) as well as occasional programmes for other radio stations in the U.K., Europe and the former Soviet Union.

Gerard McBurney has written, researched and presented more than two dozen documentary television films for British and German television channels, mostly working with the director Barrie Gavin.

His reconstruction of Shostakovich's rediscovered operatic fragment Orango was premiered by the Los Angeles Philharmonic in December 2011.

Shostakovich reconstructions

 Hypothetically Murdered (1992)
 Orango (2011)

Notes and references

External links

 Biography
 Beyond the Score
 Gerard McBurney on The Music of World War II, a lecture recorded at the Pritzker Military Museum & Library

English male composers
English radio presenters
Living people
1954 births
People from Cambridge
Alumni of Corpus Christi College, Cambridge
20th-century English composers
20th-century British male musicians
21st-century English composers
21st-century British male musicians
People educated at Winchester College
Moscow Conservatory alumni
Academics of the University of West London
Academics of the Royal Academy of Music
English people of American descent